The 1994 ECAC Hockey Men's Ice Hockey Tournament was the 33rd tournament in league history. It was played between March 8 and March 19, 1994. Preliminary and quarterfinal games were played at home team campus sites, while the 'final four' games were played at the Olympic Arena (subsequently renamed Herb Brooks Arena) in Lake Placid, New York. By winning the tournament, Harvard received the ECAC's automatic bid to the 1994 NCAA Division I Men's Ice Hockey Tournament.

Format
The tournament featured four rounds of play. The two teams that finish below tenth place in the standings are not eligible for tournament play. In the preliminary round, the seventh and tenth seeds and the eighth and ninth seeds each play a single game to determine the final qualifying teams for the quarterfinals. In the quarterfinals the first seed and lower ranked qualifier, the second and higher ranked qualifier, the third seed and sixth seed and the fourth seed and fifth seed played a modified best-of-three series, where the first team to receive 3 points moves on. After the opening round every series becomes a single-elimination game. In the semifinals, the highest seed plays the lowest remaining seed while the two remaining teams play with the winners advancing to the championship game and the losers advancing to the third place game. The tournament champion receives an automatic bid to the 1994 NCAA Division I Men's Ice Hockey Tournament.

Conference standings
Note: GP = Games played; W = Wins; L = Losses; T = Ties; PTS = Points; GF = Goals For; GA = Goals Against

Bracket
Teams are reseeded after the first two rounds

Note: * denotes overtime period(s)

Preliminary round

(7) Colgate vs. (10) St. Lawrence

(8) Cornell vs. (9) Princeton

Quarterfinals

(1) Harvard vs. (8) Cornell

(2) Clarkson vs. (7) Colgate

(3) Rensselaer vs. (6) Union

(4) Brown vs. (5) Vermont

Semifinals

(1) Harvard vs. (4) Brown

(2) Clarkson vs. (3) Rensselaer

Third place

(2) Clarkson vs. (4) Brown

Championship

(1) Harvard vs. (3) Rensselaer

Tournament awards

All-Tournament Team
F Bryan Richardson (Rensselaer)
F Steve Martins (Harvard)
F Craig Conroy (Clarkson)
D Derek Maguire (Harvard)
D Sean McCann* (Harvard)
G Aaron Israel (Harvard)
* Most Outstanding Player(s)

References

External links
ECAC Hockey
1993–94 ECAC Hockey Standings
1993–94 NCAA Standings

ECAC Hockey Men's Ice Hockey Tournament
ECAC tournament